D'Arrest is a lunar impact crater that is located in the lava-flooded region to the west of the Mare Tranquillitatis. It is named after the German astronomer Heinrich Louis d'Arrest. It lies to the southeast of the crater Agrippa and northwest of Delambre. Just to the northeast are the small, bowl-shaped craters De Morgan and Cayley.

The outer rim of D'Arrest is broken in several places, with a gash at the south end and a wide gap to the northeast where only a low ridge remains in place of the original wall. The interior has been resurfaced by lava, leaving a nearly flat, featureless floor. The surviving rim is low and worn, with ridges connecting it to the south and southwest.

Satellite craters

By convention these features are identified on lunar maps by placing the letter on the side of the crater midpoint that is closest to D'Arrest.

References

External links

D'Arrest at The Moon Wiki

Other articles
  - includes a couple of craters such as D'Arrest (sometimes as d'Arrest)

Impact craters on the Moon